Bang Len is a district (amphoe) in the northern part of Nakhon Pathom province, central Thailand.

History
The district was created in 1896 under the name Bang Phai Nat (บางไผ่นารถ). The district office was in Ban Bang Phai Nat, Tambon Bang Sai Pa, on the east bank of the Tha Chin River. Later the government moved the central district to Tambon Bang Pla on the west bank of the Tha Chin. At the same time the district name was changed accordingly to Bang Pla. In 1939 the district was again renamed and received its current name Bang Len. The district office was moved to Tambon Bang Len in 1978.

The term Bang Len refers to 'place of mire', named after Khlong Bang Len, a tributary of Tha Chin river.

Geography
Neighbouring districts are (from the north clockwise): Song Phi Nong of Suphanburi province; Lat Bua Luang of Ayutthaya province; Sai Noi of Nonthaburi province; and Phutthamonthon, Nakhon Chai Si, Don Tum, and Kamphaeng Saen of Nakhon Pathom Province.

Economy
Wat Lampaya floating market (ตลาดน้ำวัดลำพญา) on the Tha Chin river is a well-known floating market as is Don Wai in Sam Phran.

In mid-2019, the Department of Airports (DOA) proposed the construction of a new airport in Nakhon Pathom province, 50 kilometres west of Bangkok, to relieve pressure on Bangkok's two existing airports. The 20 billion baht airport would occupy 3,500 rai of land in Bang Len as well as Nakhon Chai Si District. Its capacity would be 25 million passengers annually. If approved, construction would start in 2023 and the airport would be operational by 2025 or 2026.

Administration
The district is divided into 15 subdistricts (tambons), which are further subdivided into 180 villages (mubans). There are four townships (thesaban tambons): Bang Len, Bang Luang, Rang Krathum, and Lam Phaya. There are 15 tambon administrative organizations, one for each tambon.

References

External links
amphoe.com

Bang Len